Sergey Mikhailovich Mironov (born 14 February 1953) is a Russian politician. He was chairman of the Federation Council, the upper house of the Russian parliament, from 2001 to 2011. He leads the faction A Just Russia in the Parliament of Russia.

Life and career 
In 1967 he joined the Komsomol.

In the 1970s, Sergey Mironov served in the airborne troops in the Soviet Army. In 1973 he was elected as deputy secretary committee of the Komsomol on ideological educational work at the Leningrad Mining Institute. After graduating from the Institute he worked as an engineer-geophysicist.  After a brief time of working as an entrepreneur, he entered politics and, in 1994, was elected deputy of the St. Petersburg Legislative Assembly. In June 2000, he was elected vice-Chairman of the St. Petersburg Legislative Assembly and, in 2001, entered the Federation Council of Russia as a representative of St. Petersburg. In December 2001, Sergey Mironov was elected to be a Speaker of the Federation Council. Since February 2003, Sergey Mironov has been the Chairman of the Council of Inter-Parliamentary Assembly of States – members of the Commonwealth of Independent States and since April 2003 – Chairman of the Russian Party of Life. Sergey Mironov is from Saint Petersburg.

Mironov was a candidate in the 2004 presidential election. He was not considered to be a serious candidate and was quoted as saying: "We all want Vladimir Putin to be the next president." He polled less than one per cent of the vote.

In October 2006, he became the leader of the new left-wing opposition party A Just Russia (Справедливая Россия), which was formed by uniting Rodina, Mironov's Russian Party of Life, and the Russian Pensioners' Party. This effectively makes him the leader of the opposition as the three parties together would be stronger than the Communist Party of the Russian Federation.

Mironov has several times proposed an amendment to the Russian constitution that would allow the President to be elected for 3 consecutive 5 or 7 year terms. In 2007, Boris Gryzlov, leader of the rival United Russia party, said that changing the constitution would be unacceptable. Mironov is considered to be more socialistic oriented, as he pushes for setting up special agricultural exchanges for state purchases of agricultural goods and for more state intervention in regulating prices of basic food stuff.

In the March 2012 presidential election, he received 3.86% of the votes.

In March 2014, Mironov was included in list of Russian government sanctioned individuals because of their direct or alleged indirect involvement in the 2014 Crimean crisis. On 25 July 2014, amidst an armed insurgency in Eastern Ukraine, the Ukrainian Interior Ministry launched criminal proceedings against Mironov for alleged financial support to the armed insurgents.

During the 2022 Russian invasion of Ukraine, he referred to the Ukrainian government as a "Nazi regime" that "had to be destroyed".

In January 2023 he posted a photo of himself posing with a sledgehammer branded with Wagner Group logo atop an engraving of a pile of skulls.  This sledgehammer was presented to him by the Wagner Group.

Russians critical of the 2022 Russian mobilization have used social media and other electronic means (e.g. Twitter) to enquire en masse Russia's top officials, who support war with Ukraine and mobilization, whether they themselves or their sons would go to the front. Most of them refused to answer or gave excuses, such as Mironov.

In late 2022, Russian opposition politician Nikita Yuferev accused Mironov of violating Russia's 2022 war censorship laws.

Political positions
Mironov opposes the legalization of short-barreled firearms in Russia, but, at the moment, admits the presence of such weapons in those who have served in the country's armed forces to have such weapons, thus softening his categorical position on this issue. Mironov himself has six premium short-barreled pistols. He also opposes euthanasia. Mironov's political views are leftist, which he has repeatedly stated. He is a supporter of a progressive scale of taxation and a tax on luxury. In 2005, he was the first politician to propose declaring the income of family members of civil servants.

He is a supporter of the introduction of the death penalty for pedophilia.

The Project "Do or Go!"
On 11 February 2016, Mironov announced the start of an all-Russian campaign to collect 10 million signatures under demands against the prime minister and ministers. Mironov's project provides for the resignation of the government if the following demands of the Russians are not met. Their list is replenished during the action in accordance with the proposals of citizens.

During the first day of the action, over 70,000 signatures were collected, by August 2016 - about 5 million. The first signature under the requirements within the framework of the project "Do or Go!" was put by himself Mironov. If all 10 million signatures are collected, Mironov's ultimatum will become the most massive officially registered protest action against the actions of the government in the entire history of Russia.

Mironov's project was preceded by a successful action to collect a million signatures against payments for capital repairs until the state fulfilled its obligations to citizens.

Personal life

His third wife Irina Yurievna Mironova is an officer apparatus to the Interparliamentary Assembly of the CIS. They have a son and a daughter.

In 2008, President Vladimir Putin awarded Mironov the Order "For Merit to the Fatherland", 3rd degree.

In 2011, after an initiative of United Russia in the Legislative Assembly of Saint Petersburg, Mironov was recalled from the Federation Council.

Wealth
According to The Insider in a report published in January 2022, Mironov's family owns an elite apartment in Moscow worth 350 million rubles, which is almost 70 times more than the politician's officially declared annual income. The apartment has an area of 235 square meters and is located in the residential complex "Park Palace" on Prechistenskaya embankment. Mironov's ex-wife Olga and their minor son live in it, and since 2015 its official owner has been Olga's brother, who could not buy such expensive real estate with his own money, since the annual revenue of his business is less than 14 million rubles. The Insider called the divorce of Sergey and Olga Mironov fictitious, noting that she continues to wear a wedding ring on her finger and that her Facebook page still indicates that she is married to Mironov.

Electoral history

2004 presidential campaign

Mironov ran for president in the 2004 presidential election as the nominee of the Russian Party of Life. His candidacy was seen largely as a ploy to lend credence to the contest, as he was widely known to be a strong supporter of Vladimir Putin. He was even quoted as declaring, "We all want Vladimir Putin to be the next president."

Mironov's campaign slogan was "Justice and Responsibility".

Most Russians were unfamiliar with Mironov and were disinterested in his candidacy.

2012 presidential campaign

Running in 2012 as the A Just Russia nominee, Mironov called for a return to a socialist model of government. Mironov was nominated by his party on 10 December 2011.

While he stated that he predicted a Putin victory, he declared that he would support Gennady Zyuganov in a hypothetical runoff against Putin.

Honours and awards
 Order of Merit for the Fatherland, 3rd class (14 February 2008) - for outstanding contribution to the strengthening and development of Russian statehood and parliamentarism
 Jubilee Medal "300 Years of the Russian Navy"
 Medal "In Commemoration of the 300th Anniversary of Saint Petersburg" (2003)
 Medal "In Commemoration of the 1000th Anniversary of Kazan" (2005)
 Collar of the Order of Merit of Peru (2005)
 Medal of Honour (South Ossetia, October 9, 2009) - for outstanding contribution to the maintenance of peace and stability in the Caucasus, active support in upholding the independence of South Ossetia and its international recognition, help in restoring the ruined economy of the republic
 Order of St. Sergius, 1st class (Russian Orthodox Church, 2008) and 2nd class (2003)
 Medal "For military cooperation" (Ministry of Internal Affairs of Russia, 2005)
 Badge of Honour "For merits in development of parliamentarism" and Certificate of Merit of the Federal Assembly of Russian Federation
 Badge "For merits in strengthening cooperation with the Accounts Chamber of the Russian Federation" (2006)
 Medal "For outstanding contribution to the Collector business in Russia"
 Three times awarded personal firearms - Makarov, PMM and Vector pistols
 Honorary Doctor of Nizhny Novgorod State University, Bashkir State University (2006), National Academy of Sciences of Armenia, Russian State Social University, Mongolian University of Science and Technology, Far Eastern State University of Communications, Moscow State Forest University, Slavonic University (Moldova, 2007), Khakassia State University NF Katanova and Russian-Tajik Slavonic University
 Professor Emeritus of the North-West Academy of Public Administration (2004), Perm State Technical University and Bryansk State University
 Honorary Professor of South-Ural State University (2003) and Moscow State Pedagogical University
 Honorary Citizen of Makhachkala (2006)

References

External links

 

 
1953 births
Living people
21st-century Russian politicians
A Just Russia politicians
Russian nationalists
Anti-Ukrainian sentiment in Russia
Russian conspiracy theorists
Chairmen of the Federation Council (Russia)
Members of the Federation Council of Russia (after 2000)
People from Pushkin, Saint Petersburg
People of the annexation of Crimea by the Russian Federation
Recipients of the Order "For Merit to the Fatherland", 3rd class
Candidates in the 2004 Russian presidential election
Candidates in the 2012 Russian presidential election
Saint Petersburg Mining University alumni
Saint Petersburg State University alumni
Russian individuals subject to the U.S. Department of the Treasury sanctions
Russian individuals subject to European Union sanctions
Fifth convocation members of the State Duma (Russian Federation)
Sixth convocation members of the State Duma (Russian Federation)
Seventh convocation members of the State Duma (Russian Federation)
Eighth convocation members of the State Duma (Russian Federation)
Members of Legislative Assembly of Saint Petersburg